Clyde Crashcup is a fictional character from the early 1960s animated television series The Alvin Show. He is a scientist in a white coat who tends to "invent" things that had already been invented; his experiments invariably fail. He usually invented by penciling the concept in air, with the picture becoming the actual object. The character has also appeared in comics and other Alvin and the Chipmunks works after The Alvin Show.

Creation 
Clyde Crashcup was created by Ross Bagdasarian. He is voiced by Shepard Menken impersonating Richard Haydn.

Fictional character biography 
Crashcup is a scientist in a white coat whose experiments invariably failed. His was the only voice heard in many of the episodes because the other main character in the series was his assistant Leonardo, who only whispered into Clyde's ear.

Clyde Crashcup was primarily an inventor rather than a researcher, although he tended to "invent" things that had already been invented. However, in one episode, he built a functioning time machine. He typically would invent something by taking a pencil out of his lab coat's pocket and drawing a picture in midair of his conception: the picture would then become the actual object.

Clyde's catchphrase was to break down the name of his invention into its metonymic elements to explain his thought process. For example, when asked to justify the invention of the telephone, he would say "That's 'tele-' for tele and '-phone' for phone: telephone."

In one episode, though, Clyde invented a wife, voiced by June Foray. Clyde had one of the four segments, and the Chipmunks starred in the other three (two of which were musical segments). In the episode "Crashcup Invents the Birthday Party", Foray provided the (all too audible) voice for the mother of Crashcup's inaudible assistant, Leonardo.

Other media 
 Dell Comics published 5 issues of a "Clyde Crashcup" comic book from Aug-Oct 1963 to Sept-Nov 1964. During a period spanning parts of 1963 and 1964, Dell also published a 12¢ and a 25¢ comic book titled "Alvin and His Pals in Merry Christmas with Clyde Crashcup and Leonardo", in which Clyde and Leonardo appear throughout.  All were written by John Stanley.
 In 1981, Crashcup appeared on the TV-special A Chipmunk Christmas, in a dream sequence; he told Alvin that he'd just invented Santa Claus. True to Crashcup's earlier form, his Santa is shown as Abraham Lincoln in a hollowed out pumpkin. Charles Berendt provides the voice of Clyde Crashcup. Recent television airings of A Chipmunk Christmas edit out the dream sequence due to time constraints concerning broadcast commercial time.
 Crashcup later had a special guest spot in the modern Alvin and the Chipmunks 1990 episode "Back to Our Future", in which he showed up in the time of the new show with a time machine and brought the modern Chipmunks back to his time, where they temporarily switched places with the Alvin Show Chipmunks. It was later released on VHS on April 14, 1994, as Back to Alvin's Future.
 In Alvin and the Chipmunks Meet the Wolfman, the Chipmunks and the Chipettes go to school at Clyde C. Crashcup Elementary School, a school that could be named after him.

Notes

References

External links 
 Don Markstein's Toonopedia

Crashcup, Clyde
Crashcup, Clyde
Dell Comics titles